Bolton-by-Bowland is a civil parish in Ribble Valley, Lancashire, England.  It contains 44 listed buildings that are recorded in the National Heritage List for England.  Of these, one is listed at Grade I, the highest of the three grades; three are at Grade II*, the middle grade; and the others are at Grade II, the lowest grade.  The parish contains the village of Bolton-by-Bowland and the settlement of Holden, and surrounding countryside.  Most of the listed buildings are houses and associated structure, farmhouses, and farm buildings.  Also listed are crosses, cross bases, churches and associated structures, bridges, a wellhouse, a school, a public house, and stocks.

Key

Buildings

Notes and references

Notes

Citations

Sources

Lists of listed buildings in Lancashire
Buildings and structures in Ribble Valley